William Dodds (born 5 February 1969) is a Scottish football coach and former player who is the manager of Inverness Caledonian Thistle.

His playing career started with English club Chelsea and the rest of his career was spent in Scotland with Partick Thistle, Dundee, St Johnstone, Aberdeen, Dundee United and Rangers. Dodds made 26 appearances for Scotland, scoring seven goals.

He has had coaching spells at Queen of the South, Dundee and Ross County, leaving his post as assistant manager of the latter in September 2017.

Club career

Early career
Born in New Cumnock, Dodds began his career with English club Chelsea in 1986. He made his senior debut on loan to Partick Thistle in 1987–88. After making only three appearances for Chelsea, he was transferred to Dundee in 1989. He scored 68 league goals in 174 appearances for Dundee, winning a Scottish First Division title in the 1991–92 season and scoring a hat-trick in the 1990 Scottish Challenge Cup Final.

St Johnstone
Dodds moved to St Johnstone, for a club record £400,000 transfer fee in January 1994 but moved to Aberdeen within six months.

Aberdeen
Dodds was Aberdeen's record signing at £800,000. During his time at Pittodrie, he scored important goals to prevent relegation in 1994–95 and was part of the side that won the 1995–96 Scottish League Cup, scoring as The Dons beat his former club Dundee in the November 1995 final having also netted both goals in the semi-final victory the previous month. Dodds remained at Aberdeen until September 1998, when manager Alex Miller used him – along with £700,000 – in a swap deal to bring Robbie Winters to Pittodrie Stadium from Dundee United.

Dundee United
Dodds enjoyed something of a rebirth when Aberdeen offered him and cash for Winters. Restored to playing as a striker, Dodds' full debut for United saw a hat-trick against former club St Johnstone, earning him instant hero status. During his time at Tannadice, he scored 25 goals in 45 league appearances.

Rangers
In December 1999, less than fifteen months after joining United, 30-year-old Dodds was signed for Rangers (the club he supported in childhood) by manager Dick Advocaat for £1.3m, following injuries to forwards Michael Mols and Jonatan Johansson. Dodds proved an instant success at Ibrox, scoring goals domestically and in European competition. Dodds was part of the squad that won a League and Scottish Cup double in 2000, and a cup double in 2002. He has described his time with Rangers as "the pinnacle of my career". First team opportunities dried up later in his stay, leading to his departure in January 2003.

Final playing spell
With few first team opportunities under new Rangers manager Alex McLeish, Dodds returned to Dundee United in January 2003 as he was swapped for Steven Thompson. On Dodds' second debut for United, he scored the first equaliser in a 2–2 draw at home to Kilmarnock.

During 2005, Dodds signed a new contract at Dundee United that would see him work with manager Gordon Chisholm as both player and first team coach. Now playing more in midfield or as a sweeper as his pace began to slow, Dodds helped United avoid relegation that year. When Chisholm was sacked as manager in January 2006, Dodds took over as caretaker manager for one match, a 2–1 win against Falkirk in the Premier League. When Craig Brewster took over as manager the following week, Dodds left the club. He then signed for Second Division club Partick Thistle as a player later that month, but left after making only three appearances.

International career
Dodds gained his first Scotland cap on 5 October 1996 against Latvia while playing for Aberdeen, coming on as a 59th-minute substitute in the 1998 FIFA World Cup Qualifier win in Riga. He was in the starting line-up for the following fixture against Estonia in Tallinn four days later, but a scheduling dispute meant the home team did not adhere to a quickly-rearranged afternoon kick-off time, and the match was abandoned at kick-off with no caps awarded to the Scotland players; the fixture was re-arranged for the following February, but Dodds was not selected.

His form at Dundee United attracted the attentions of Scotland coach Craig Brown, who restored Dodds to the Scotland squad after a twelve-month absence. During his time with United, he featured in ten competitive international matches, including the UEFA Euro 2000 play-off matches against England, scoring four times during the qualifying, with his first two goals for Scotland coming against Estonia at Tynecastle Park, and a long-range winning goal away to Bosnia and Herzegovina.

He continued to be selected whilst at Rangers, with his 26th and final cap coming in September 2001 against Belgium, a match which Scotland lost 2-0 meaning they would not qualify for the 2002 FIFA World Cup. He scored three times in the group taking his goals total to seven, all in competitive matches.

Coaching career

Assistant
Gordon Chisholm appointed Dodds as strikers' coach at Queen of the South. Queens made it to the 2008 Scottish Cup Final, which they lost 3–2 to Rangers. This led to the club's first appearance in a UEFA organised competition, the 2008–09 UEFA Cup.

Chisholm selected Dodds to be his assistant manager when he was appointed manager of Dundee in March 2010. In October 2010, as Dundee entered administration, Chisholm and Dodds were made redundant as the administrator Bryan Jackson set about the task of saving the club from liquidation. Dodds subsequently objected to the company voluntary arrangement (CVA) that took Dundee out of administration in 2011.

On 9 September 2014, Dodds become assistant manager to Jim McIntyre at Ross County. He left the club on 25 September 2017 when both he and McIntyre were sacked. When McIntyre was appointed Dundee manager in October 2018, Dodds was linked with the assistant position there. This move did not proceed as Dundee fans objected to Dodds due to his vote against the CVA, and Jimmy Boyle was appointed assistant instead.

Inverness CT manager
Dodds joined Inverness Caledonian Thistle as an assistant to interim manager Neil McCann during the latter part of the 2020–21 season after John Robertson went on compassionate leave. At the end of the season Inverness appointed Dodds as their new Head Coach, with Robertson becoming their sporting director.

Career statistics

Club

International

Scores and results list Scotland's goal tally first, score column indicates score after each Dodds goal.

Managerial record

Honours
Dundee
Scottish Challenge Cup: 1990–91
Scottish First Division: 1991–92

Aberdeen
Scottish League Cup: 1995–96

Rangers
Scottish Premier League: 1999–2000
Scottish Cup: 1999–2000
Scottish League Cup: 2001–02

See also
 List of footballers in Scotland by number of league appearances (500+)

References

External links

Club profile at Sporting-Heroes.net
International profile at Sporting-Heroes.net
Profile at Dundee United FC Historical Archive
Profile at AFC Heritage Trust

1969 births
Living people
Footballers from East Ayrshire
Scottish footballers
Chelsea F.C. players
Partick Thistle F.C. players
Dundee F.C. players
St Johnstone F.C. players
Aberdeen F.C. players
Dundee United F.C. players
Rangers F.C. players
Scotland international footballers
Scotland B international footballers
English Football League players
Scottish Football League players
Scottish Premier League players
Dundee United F.C. non-playing staff
Dundee F.C. non-playing staff
Association football forwards
Scottish radio personalities
Scottish football managers
Inverness Caledonian Thistle F.C. managers
Scottish Professional Football League managers